Fernand Viau (24 May 1909 – 3 June 2000) was a Liberal party member of the House of Commons of Canada. He was born in Montreal, Quebec and had a military career.

He was first elected at the Saint Boniface riding in the 1945 general election, then re-elected for successive terms there in 1949 and 1953. Viau lost the Liberal party nomination for Saint Boniface for the 1957 election to Louis Deniset. Viau then campaigned in the riding as an Independent Liberal but was defeated by Deniset.

Viau died on 3 June 2000.

Electoral history

References

External links
 

1909 births
2000 deaths
Members of the House of Commons of Canada from Manitoba
Liberal Party of Canada MPs